Highway 324 is a highway in the Canadian province of Saskatchewan. It runs from Highway 378 to Range Road 3120 near Mayfair.

Highway 324 also passes near Redfield. It connects with Highways 376 and 686.

References

324